Christopher Nicholas Greaves (born 12 October 1990) is a Scottish cricketer. In June 2019, he was selected to represent Scotland A in their tour to Ireland to play the Ireland Wolves. He made his List A debut for Scotland A against the Ireland Wolves on 6 June 2019. He made his Twenty20 debut for Scotland A against the Ireland Wolves on 9 June 2019.

In September 2021, Greaves was named in Scotland's Twenty20 International (T20I) squad for their series against Zimbabwe, and in Scotland's squads for the 2021 Summer T20 Bash and the 2021 ICC Men's T20 World Cup. He made his T20I debut on 8 October 2021, for Scotland against Papua New Guinea. In Scotland's opening match of the 2021 ICC Men's T20 World Cup, Greaves had a man of the match performance against Bangladesh.

In May 2022, Greaves was named in Scotland's One Day International (ODI) squad for the 2022 United States Tri-Nation Series. He made his ODI debut on 29 May 2022, for Scotland against the United States.

References

External links
 

1990 births
Living people
Scottish cricketers
Scotland One Day International cricketers
Scotland Twenty20 International cricketers
Cricketers from Johannesburg